Bhaiṣajyasamudgata (or Medicine Risen), is a bodhisattva mentioned within the Lotus Sutra and the Bhaiṣajyarāja-bhaiṣajyasamudgata-sūtra (Sūtra Spoken by the Buddha on Visualizing the Two Bodhisattvas Bhaisajyarāja and Bhaisajyasamudgata). In chapter 23 of the Lotus Sutra (The Bodhisattva Bhaiṣajyarāja), the Buddha tells the story of Bhaiṣajyasamudgata's brother the 'Medicine King' Bodhisattva, who, in a previous life, burnt his body as a supreme offering to a Buddha. He is said to have been reborn over a period of numerous lifetimes healing and curing diseases, and is a representation of the healing power of the Buddha.

Notes

References 

Suzuki, Takayasu (2014). The Compilers of the Bhaisajyarajapurvayoga-parivarta Who Did Not Know the Rigid Distinction between Stupa and Caitya in the Saddharmapundarika. Journal of Indian and Buddhist Studies 62 (3), 1185-1193

Yün-hua, Jan (1965). Buddhist Self-Immolation in Medieval China, History of Religions, 4 (2), 243-268

External links 
 SGI Library Online — The Soka Gakkai Dictionary of Buddhism

Bodhisattvas